Liu Qinglan is a Chinese sprint canoer. Competing in the early 1990s, she won a bronze medal in the K-4 500m event at the 1991 ICF Canoe Sprint World Championships in Paris.

References

Chinese female canoeists
Living people
Year of birth missing (living people)
ICF Canoe Sprint World Championships medalists in kayak